Simon Patrick Geoghegan (born 1 September 1968 in Knebworth, Hertfordshire) is an Irish former rugby union player who played at wing in England for London Irish and Bath and in the Irish Inter-provincial Championships for Connacht Rugby and the Irish Exiles. He finished his rugby career at Bath Rugby where a debilitating toe injury limited his appearances and finally ended his playing career.

Geoghegan is perhaps best known for his try in the 1994 Five Nations match against England at Twickenham, that was instrumental in a famous 13–12 win. Another key contribution during the match was a  kick, chase and tackle on England fly-half Rob Andrew which led to a crucial kickable penalty to Ireland. An adept side stepper, he was once described by the commentator Bill McLaren as being "Like a mad trout up a burn".

Geoghegan was controversially left out of the 1993 British and Irish Lions tour to New Zealand when England's Ian Hunter and Tony Underwood were taken ahead of him.  Former New Zealand hooker and Geoghegan's then London Irish coach Hika Reid was quoted at the time as being surprised as he felt the conditions would have suited him.  In 1997 the Lions management apparently held a place open for him until the last possible minute, even though he had played little rugby that year due to the toe problems that cut short his career.

As an amateur player Geoghegan had a career outside rugby as a solicitor.  He is currently a real estate and finance partner in London at  Rosling King LLP

Geoghegan qualified for Ireland through his Galway born father. His grandfather played in the 1929 All-Ireland Hurling Final.

References

External links 
sporting-heroes.net profile
statistics from scrum.com
London Irish profile

Irish rugby union players
Ireland international rugby union players
London Irish players
Connacht Rugby players
Bath Rugby players
1968 births
Living people
People educated at St Edmund's College, Ware
British solicitors
Irish Exiles rugby union players
Rugby union wings
Rugby union players from Hertfordshire